The Bridgewater Monument is a Grade II* listed monumental column in the Ashridge estate in Hertfordshire, England. It was built in 1832 to commemorate Francis Egerton, 3rd Duke of Bridgewater (1736–1803), known as the "Canal Duke".

History

Francis Egerton, 3rd Duke of Bridgewater and 6th Earl of Bridgewater was a pioneer in the construction of canals during the early part of Industrial Revolution. In 1761 he opened the Bridgewater Canal in North West England to transport coal from his mines in Worsley to Manchester, later extending it to Runcorn, and then to Leigh. It is often said to be the first true canal in Britain, and earned him the nickname of "the Canal Duke".

The monument is near the family seat Ashridge House in Hertfordshire, which the Duke neglected for many years and then decided to rebuild.
Although he demolished the dilapidated house, he did not see through his ambitious plans as he died in 1803, leaving the ruins to his successor, John Egerton, 7th Earl of Bridgewater, who built a new house.

A marble wall monument there commemorates his death.

A memorial to the Duke was considered by his successor, the 7th Earl of Bridgewater, but it was not until the death of his brother, Francis Egerton, 8th Earl of Bridgewater in 1829 that funds were made available. The 8th Earl left in his will £13,500 and instructions to build a monument to the Canal Duke.

Construction
At the time, Charlotte Catherine Anne, Countess of Bridgewater and widow of the 7th Earl was still in residence at Ashridge. She objected to the erection of an obelisk, which she considered to be poor taste, and at her behest, the monument to the Canal Duke was sited some distance from Ashridge House so as not to be seen. To build the monument, the family appointed Sir Jeffry Wyattville, the architect who also worked on the Gothic Revival house on the estate. In line with the countess's wishes, he altered the design to that of a Greek column.

The Bridgewater Monument was designed by Wyattville in a Neoclassical style, consisting of a giant -tall fluted Greek Doric column, surmounted by a giant copper funerary urn finial.

There are 172 steps inside, and the abacus provides a viewing platform. At the base, the large pedestal is inscribed with the words:

Inside the entrance passage leading up to the staircase, there is a brass plate which records the instruction of the 8th Earl to erect the monument with the inscription:

The Bridgewater Monument stands on Moneybury Hill, a protruding part of the Ashridge plateau, and overlooks the village of Aldbury.

Visitor attraction
Today the Bridgewater Monument, like the Ashridge Estate, is in the care of the National Trust. At weekends, the monument is open to visitors, who can climb 172 steps inside the column to enjoy views of Ashridge and the Chiltern Hills. It is also possible to see as far as Canary Wharf in central London.

Image gallery

References

External links

Grade II* listed monuments and memorials
Monuments and memorials in Hertfordshire
Monumental columns in England
Neoclassical architecture in Hertfordshire
Ashridge
National Trust properties in Buckinghamshire
Tourist attractions in Hertfordshire
Buildings and structures completed in 1832
1832 in England